Robert Powell is an English actor.

Robert Powell or variants may also refer to:

 Robert Powell (author), Australian author
 Robert Powell (composer) (born 1932), American organist and composer
 Robert Powell (cricketer) (born 1979), English cricketer
 Robert Powell (footballer) (born 1976), Australian rules footballer
 Robert Powell (racing driver), American racing driver
 Robert Powell (tennis) (1881–1917), also known as Bobby, Canadian tennis player
 Robert Powell (herpetologist) (born 1948), American herpetologist
 Robert Powel[l], puppeteer, alias of Martin Powell
 Robert E. Powell (1923–1997), mayor of Monroe, Louisiana, 1979–1996
 Robert Baden-Powell, 1st Baron Baden-Powell (1857–1941), founder of Scouting movement
 Robert Baden Powell (politician) (1901–1976), Canadian politician
 Leroy Powell (Robert Leroy Powell, 1933–2014), American baseball player who played as Bob Powell (Chicago White Sox)
 Rob Powell (born 1980), rugby league coach
 Rob Powell (athlete), American athlete and fitness coach
 Bob Powell (1916–1967), comic book artist
 Bob Powell (cricketer) (1902-1976), New Zealand cricketer
 Bobby Powell (politician) (born 1981), member of the Florida Senate
 Bobby Powell (musician) (born 1943), Louisiana blues pianist
 Longie Powell (Robert V. Powell, 1919–1969), American basketball player